The Boronia Park, or the Boronia Park Reserve, is a waterfront parkland and nature reserve wholly within the suburb of Hunters Hill, in the Municipality of Hunter's Hill, New South Wales, Australia. The park dates back to pre-colonial New South Wales, with original and widely diverse flora and fauna:

Etymology
The park was named after the Boronia ledifolia which is all but locally extinct, probably due to the introduction of rabbits in the 19th century.

Geography
The Boronia Park is bordered in Hunters Hill by Park Road to the west, High Street to the north, Ryde Road to the south and the Lane Cove River and Boronia Avenue to the east.

Public use and amenities 
Three ovals are available for playing various sports and it is also the home of the Hunters Hill Rugby Union Football Club and Ryde Hunters Hill Pirates Cricket Club. The main oval has one grandstand which contains several rows of seats. 

The Boronia Park Public School, named after the parkland and reserve, is located on the east side of Pittwater Road (between Pittwater Road and Earl Street), wholly within the suburb of Hunters Hill. It provides schooling for around 650 pupils of the local area. It prides itself in its beautiful grounds, much of which is shaded by leafy trees which are characteristic of the area.

Nearby is the Gladesville-Boronia Park Uniting Church.

The Great North Walk passes through Boronia Park just downstream of Tipperary Falls.

See also

 Protected areas of New South Wales

References

Parks in New South Wales
Nature reserves in New South Wales
Municipality of Hunter's Hill